Mouhamadou Moustapha Gning (born 23 January 1989), is a Senegalese footballer who plays as a defensive midfielder for SD Ejea in the Segunda División B Group 2.

Career statistics

Club

References

External sources

1989 births
Living people
Senegalese footballers
Footballers from Dakar
Association football midfielders
Segunda División B players
Tercera División players
UD Logroñés players
CD Sariñena players
SD Amorebieta footballers
CD Ebro players
Lleida Esportiu footballers
SD Ejea players
Indian Super League players
Kerala Blasters FC players
Expatriate footballers in India
Expatriate footballers in Spain
Senegalese expatriates in Spain
Senegalese expatriate sportspeople in India
Senegalese expatriate sportspeople in Spain